Planinitsa (Bulgarian: Планиница, also transliterated 
Planinica) is a village in western Bulgaria. Its located in Oblast Pernik, Obshtina Pernik.

Geography and climate
Planinitsa is in a mountainous region, 45 km southwest of Sofia and 12 km west of Pernik.

The climate is humid continental with cool summer and average temperatures of 22 °C and soft and snowy winter with average temperatures of 1 °C.

Events
Every first Sunday of July the village celebrates the traditional day of the village.

Name
The name derives from the Bulgarian word Planina, which means mountain + the Slavic suffix -itsa.

The village was recorded in historical records in 1448 as Planintsi.

Landmarks
Late antique and medieval fortress in Gradishte, 1.16 km west of the village of Planinitsa, on the eastern slope of Cherna Gora. The fortress was built in late antiquity on an area of about 3 acres. In the past, part of the fortress walls and the separate rooms to them were preserved. It also existed in the early Middle Ages.

Political situation
The village shares a mayor with the neighbouring village of Leskovets, due to the small size of the village.

Notable people

 Vergil Vaklinov (1931 – 1953), Border Guard
 Alexander Alexandrov (1991 – ), GERB
Alexander Planinski (1879 - 1969), Writer

References

Villages in Pernik Province